Barium iodate is an inorganic chemical compound with the chemical formula Ba(IO3)2. It is a white, granular substance.

Derivation 
Barium iodate can be derived either as a product of a reaction of iodine and barium hydroxide or by combining barium chlorate with potassium iodate.

Chemical properties 
If the temperature is higher than that value, the following reaction, known as Rammelsberg's reaction, occurs:

References

External links 
 Definition of Insoluble salts (precipitates); Solubility product

Inorganic compounds
Iodates
Barium compounds